The 1997 Individual Speedway Junior World Championship was the 21st edition of the World motorcycle speedway Under-21 Championships. The event was won by Jesper B. Jensen of Denmark and he also gained qualification to 1998 Speedway Grand Prix.

World final
August 2, 1997
 Mšeno

References

1997
World I J
1997 in Czech sport
Speedway competitions in the Czech Republic